"Gigantes" (English: "Giants") is a song by Spanish singer Ruth Lorenzo. It was released on 7 October 2014 as a digital download in Spain as the second single from her debut studio album Planeta Azul (2014). The song peaked at number 6 on the Spanish Singles Chart.

Music video
A music video to accompany the release of "Gigantes" was first released onto YouTube on 22 October 2014 at a total length of three minutes and forty-three seconds.

Track listing

Chart performance

Weekly charts

Release history

References

2014 singles
2014 songs
Ruth Lorenzo songs